Przemysław Urbańczyk (born October 21, 1951) is a Polish archaeologist who is Professor of Archaeology at Cardinal Stefan Wyszyński University in Warsaw and the Institute of Archeology and Ethnology at the Polish Academy of Sciences. He is the author of more than 400 scientific books and articles on the archaeological history of Europe.

Selected works
The Soloey farm maound, 1985
Medieval arctic Norway, 1992
Władza i polityka we wczesnym średniowieczu, 2000 
Rok 1000. Milenijna podróż transkontynentalna, 2001
Zdobywcy Północnego Atlantyku, 2004
Herrschaft und Politik im Frühen Mittelalter, 2007
Trudne początki Polski, 2008
Mieszko Pierwszy Tajemniczy, 2012
Myśli o średniowieczu, 2013
Central Europe in the High Middle Ages, 2013 
Bliskie spotkania wikingów, 2014
Zanim Polska została Polską, 2015
Co się stało w 966 roku?, 2016
 Bolesław Chrobry - lew ryczący, 2017
Co się stało w 1018 roku?, Poznań, 2018

References

 Przemysław Urbańczyk: Bibliografia w Litdok Europa Środkowo-Wschodnia
 http://www.urbanczyk.info.pl 
 https://nauka-polska.pl/#/profile/scientist

1951 births
Adam Mickiewicz University in Poznań alumni
Academic staff of Cardinal Stefan Wyszyński University in Warsaw
Living people
Academic staff of the Polish Academy of Sciences
20th-century Polish archaeologists
University of Warsaw alumni
21st-century Polish archaeologists